Parvin Talukder Maya is a Bangladesh Awami League politician and the former Member of Parliament from a reserved seat.

Career
Maya was elected to parliament from reserved seat as a Bangladesh Awami League candidate in 2009. On 17 May 2018, over 600 people fell sick after eating food at an event organized by her and her husband in Jhenaidah District.

References

Awami League politicians
Living people
Women members of the Jatiya Sangsad
9th Jatiya Sangsad members
21st-century Bangladeshi women politicians
21st-century Bangladeshi politicians
Year of birth missing (living people)